The jellabiya, also jalabiya or galabeya ( / ALA-LC: , Egyptian slang: Galabyia, ; "jelebeeya" in Ethiopia; "jehllubeeya" in Eritrea) is a loose-fitting, traditional Egyptian garment from the Nile Valley. Today, it is associated with farmers living in the Republic of Egypt (Giza-Cairo, Luxor, and Aswan) and comes in rich color varieties. The garment is also worn in Sudan, but has other textures and is usually white, as well as some communities from Eritrea and Ethiopia. The colorful Egyptian style is used by both men and women.

The jellabiya differs from the Arabic thawb, as it has a wider cut, no collar (in some cases, no buttons) and longer, wider sleeves. Versions for farmers have very wide sleeves and sewn-in pockets used to carry tobacco, money, or other small items. Along the Red Sea coast in Egypt, Nubia and Sudan and among Beja tribesmen, the Arabic dishdash is preferred due to the jellabiya's relation to farming.

Jellabiya worn in summer are often white. During winter, thicker fabrics that are grey, dark green, olive, blue, tan or striped are used, and colorful scarves are worn around the neck. The garment is traditionally worn with an ammama (turban).

A full male dress in Sudan usually consists of three pieces, the jibba, the kaftan, and the sederi. The gebba/jibba, is the outermost garment characterized by a long opening over the chest. The urban version used to have this opening continue to the end, which made the jibba effectively a long coat. It has one pocket on one side and on the other side, just an opening that leads to a pocket in the Kaftan, the gallabiya's undergarment. The kaftan is perfectly aligned with the jibba and worn under it for protection against both heat and cold. It is also made of pure cotton to evade irritation caused by the wool of the winter jibba. Between the kaftan and the jibba there is a sederi (vest) which has small pockets for money, cigarette packs, and even pistols. A traditional kamees and a sirwal are usually worn underneath the three piece suit.

See also

Ammama
Bekishe
Burnous
Djellaba
Hijab
Jilbāb
Thawb
Qamis

References

Dresses
Egyptian culture
Egyptian clothing
African clothing
Middle Eastern clothing
Sudanese clothing